Smålands Nation is one of thirteen student nations of Lund University in southern Sweden. The name comes from the historical province of Småland. It was one of the first nations formed after the foundation of the university, but has periodically been merged with other smaller nations due to low membership counts.

Smålands Nation is distinguished among Lund's nations as it is the only politically aligned nation, becoming officially socialist in 1972. It is due to its political nature that it is the only nation without membership in the various student bodies linking the other twelve nations together, such as the Academic Association and Kuratorskollegiet.

The nation considers itself to be politically aware, striving for equality between the sexes, protesting against pollution of the environment and other focusing on other criticisms of modern society. The nation holds a weekly feminist cafe, Ronja, a forum for gender and LGBT issues.  If food is served, it is commonly vegan.

The pub is open on Wednesdays and live bands, often from Gothenburg, perform onstage.  Clubs are held on Saturdays and feature primarily electronic music.

External links 
 Smålands Nation - Official site

Nations at Lund University